Margarita Ortigas (generally known as Marga Ortigas) is a writer and media communications consultant who previously worked as a correspondent for Al Jazeera English.

Career
Marga Ortigas is a writer, journalist, and media professional who blogs and does consulting work. She has over 25 years experience in broadcasting in Asia, Europe, and the Middle East.

Early work
Ortigas began her career as a news anchor, reporter and producer at ABS-CBN and GMA Network, in the Philippines.

CNN International
Ortigas was a field producer, editor, and reporter with CNN International news based in London from 2000 to 2005 and spent considerable time in Baghdad and the Middle East on assignment.

Al Jazeera English
Ortigas was the Senior Asia correspondent for Al Jazeera English, travelling the region extensively for 11 years. She covered all aspects including the growth of China, tensions on the Korean peninsula, cross-border and internal conflicts among ASEAN states, and the many natural disasters around Asia. She also reported extensively on both the aftermath of Super Typhoon Haiyan in the Philippines in 2013, and the Great East Japan quake in 2011.

Ortigas is one of the original correspondents of Al Jazeera English, having joined the channel at its inception in 2005.

A strong multi-media story-teller, she is on Twitter, Facebook, and other platforms. She also keeps a blog on www.i-migrant.com

In 2011, Ortigas was recognised by the International Committee of the Red Cross for Humanitarian Reporting.

Early life
Ortigas was educated at Ateneo de Manila University where she studied journalism and communications, and at the University of Greenwich (UK) where she gained a Masters in Literature as a British Council Chevening scholar. In addition to English, she speaks Spanish and Tagalog.

Filmography 
 1991-1996: GMA News Live (GMA Network)
 1992-1996: GMA Network News (GMA Network)

References

External links 
  Al Jazeera English - About us - Field correspondents
Al Jazeera English
 Al Jazeera Blogs: Marga Ortigas
Marga Ortigas Official Website

Al Jazeera people
CNN people
Living people
Ateneo de Manila University alumni
Alumni of the University of Greenwich
Filipino expatriates in the United Kingdom
Filipino expatriates in Hong Kong
Filipino journalists
Filipino women journalists
Year of birth missing (living people)